The Richmond Subdivision is a railroad line owned by CSX Transportation and operated by Indiana Eastern Railroad in the U.S. states of Ohio and Indiana. The line is dead-ended at its north and south ends and intersects in the middle with the Indianapolis Subdivision.

See also
 List of CSX Transportation lines

References

CSX Transportation lines